Gateshead College is a further education college in the town of Gateshead, England. Established on November 15, 1955 at Durham Road in Low Fell, Gateshead. It was opened by the Duke of Edinburgh. The original campus was closed as part of a planned move in January 2008. The college moved into a £39 million new main site located at the Baltic Quayside in Gateshead. Also opened during the move was the Academy for Sport based at Gateshead International Stadium and in Team Valley the Skills Academy for Automotive, Engineering, Manufacturing and Logistics. Also in Team Valley, the Skills Academy for Construction opened in summer 2008.

More than £75million has been spent developing six campuses, for academic and vocational courses. Based in the North East of England, Gateshead College offers further education to 16- to 18-year-olds, higher education, apprenticeships, part-time adult learning and training for employers.

The Baltic Campus, based on the Gateshead quayside, has a range of facilities including:

 Baltic Salon and Spa
 Gym and aerobics studio
 200 seat performance theatre
 Learning Resource Centre
 Sound proofed music rehearsal and recording studios
 Refectory, bistro, training kitchens and restaurant
 Art and design studios
 ICT Suite
 Shop
 Japanese garden

Gateshead College develops training and facilities to support the North East's bid to become a hub for sustainability. The College has also established a reputation for working in partnership with many organisations including the Chamber of Commerce, Nissan, sports teams including Gateshead Thunder and the Newcastle Vipers, and The Sage Gateshead and was chosen founder college for the National Skills Academy for Creative and Cultural Skills.

The College administers the Government's Plugged in Places project, through its Charge Your Car project. Gateshead College also established Zero Carbon Futures in 2011, to deliver a range of local and national programmes designed to advance the region as a European leader in the production of low carbon vehicles.

Notable alumni
 Chris Basham - footballer with Sheffield United
 Rachel Furness - footballer with Liverpool and Northern Ireland
 Rachael Laws - footballer with Liverpool
 Jill Scott - footballer with Manchester City and England
 Demi Stokes - footballer with Manchester City and England
 Carly Telford - footballer with Chelsea and England
 Themba Yabantu - Basketball player with Newcastle Eagles

Specialisms

 Creative Industries
 Sport 
 Low Carbon and Renewable training

Performance track
Gateshead College and One North East announced (March 2011) the creation of a unique new open-access test track facility – the only one of its kind in Europe. On January the 17th 2012 Transport Minister Norman Baker MP officially opened the Zero Carbon Futures Performance Track and Low Emission Vehicle Development Centre in Washington, Tyne & Wear. The Centre is designed to facilitate the development of the transport of the future providing the ideal location for anyone – academics, automotive manufacturers and system developers - to test and trial new transport technologies.

The test track and workshop building at Nissan Sunderland Plant has been signed over to Gateshead College on a 20-year lease allowing these facilities to be hired by companies, academic institutes and researchers.

The Test Track and vehicle development centre are available for hire to any interested bodies, ranging from universities to major OEMs and vehicle systems developers.

Designed specifically for low carbon vehicles, the Performance Track offers a comprehensive range of charging and refuelling systems, including hydrolysers, a photovoltaic canopy, EV charging points (both standard and fast charge) and biofuel tanks.

The 50sq m workshops include five bays available on flexible terms from day hire to a year lease. The infrastructure includes high-speed internet, a fast-charge bay for EVs, three-phase electricity supply, exhaust extraction systems and a range of vehicle lifts.

The 2.8 km long Performance Track incorporates the following facilities designed for on and off-road vehicle testing:

 2x 1 km straights suitable for acceleration and lane change testing
 Handling pad with various diameter markings 
 Brake test and manoeuvring area
 Test Hill
 Heliport

Road Surfaces:
 Rumble strips
 American Hop Road
 Concrete strip with metal strips
 Cobbled surface
 Road noise surface
 Road road durability
 Gravel road
 Wave road
 Rough splash road
 Pot hole tests

There is also a range of electric vehicle charging technologies including a quick charger, a solar powered charging canopy and a standard charging post – all of which are among the 1,000 charge points being installed across the region.

The centre will be run by Gateshead College.

Zero Carbon Futures

Gateshead College established Zero Carbon Futures in 2011, to deliver a range of local and national programmes designed to advance the region as a European leader in the production of low carbon vehicles. The company opened for business on December 1 and is based in the College's new £10m Skills Academy for Sustainable Manufacturing and Innovation (SASMI), in Washington, adjacent to the Performance Track.

The remit of Zero Carbon Futures includes:

 Development and implementation of Gateshead College's international low carbon vehicle strategy
 Delivery of regional and national programmes to create jobs and apprenticeships
 Consultancy on low carbon vehicle issues
 Advisory and consultancy body for sustainable manufacturing techniques

UK Electric Vehicle Apprenticeships

Gateshead College and Smith Electric Vehicles joined together in 2010 to deliver the UK's first apprenticeship in electric vehicles.

The three-year course will see young people gain workplace skills at Smith Electric Vehicles, and complete training at Gateshead College specialist Skills Academy for Automotive, Engineering, Manufacturing and Logistics.

References

External links

Education in Gateshead
Further education colleges in Tyne and Wear